Lucian Lamar Knight  (February 9, 1868 – November 19, 1933) was an American journalist, editor, author, and historian. He was the founder of the Georgia Archives. In 1919, in recognition of his work in history, he was made a Fellow of the Royal Society of Arts  of England. The University of Georgia awarded him an LL. D., while his master's degree came from Princeton University. He was also a Phi Beta Kappa.

Early life and education
Lucian Lamar Knight was born in Atlanta, Georgia, February 9, 1868. His father, Capt. George Walton Knight, served in the Mexican–American War and the Civil War. His mother was Clara Corinne (Daniel) Knight, distinguished as an educator. His first ancestor of the Knight name was settled at Jamestown, Virginia, as early as 1624. Besides his father, he had three uncles in the Confederate States Army. On his mother's side, he was also a Lamar; on his father's a Walton - both historic Southern families. Chawton Manor was the Knight family's ancestral home in England; Jane Austen belonged to this connection.

Clara Knight was widowed in 1869, with two infants. Lucian's guardianship passed to a maternal uncle, Dr. John B. Daniel, a businessman of Atlanta, and a devout Presbyterian elder.

Knight was educated in the public schools of Atlanta, the University of Georgia (A.B., 1888), and at Princeton (honorary M.A., 1904). While an undergraduate at the University of Georgia, (Athens) he won the debater's medal, received a speaker's place at commencement, on three merits class-stand, composition, and declamation, pronounced a eulogy on Chancellor Mell, edited the college annual, and, on graduating, was class orator and valedictorian. After graduation from the University of Georgia, Knight read law under Judge Richard F. Lyon, at Macon, Georgia.

Career
Journalism was his first love. For ten years, he was on the staff of The Atlanta Constitution, serving as literary editor during the period of 1892-1902. Here he was associated with Joel Chandler Harris in the writing of editorials; and when Knight's first work came from the press, it carried an introduction from "Uncle Remus".

Under a powerful conviction of duty, Knight, in 1902, relinquished his writing and eentered the theological seminary at Princeton to prepare himself for the Presbyterian ministry. While here he also took post-graduate work in the university and received his degree of Master of Arts. Before completing his studies, he was called to the Central Presbyterian Church of Washington, D.C., the church of which President Woodrow Wilson later became a member. While at Princeton, Knight studied under Wilson and was also a frequent visitor in the Wilson home. Ill health necessitated an abandonment of Knight's ministerial career.

After several months spent in foreign travel, he returned home but little improved, and on the advice of his physician, he went to Southern California, where he remained for two years (1906–08), spending most of his time on Catalina Island. His first work was written at Avalon, a fisherman's village, on Catalina Island. Here he wrote the two volumes which composed the Reminiscenses.

At the invitation of his alma mater, Knight returned to deliver the alumni address at the University of Georgia, and took for his subject, "Lee's Old War Horse; an Appeal Before the Bar of Public Opinion on Behalf of Lieutenant-general James Longstreet." On recovering his health, he accepted the associate-editorship of the Atlanta Georgian in 1909. Besides contributing to The Library of Southern Literature the sketches of two Georgians, Benjamin H. Hill and Thomas E. Watson, Knight compiled the Dictionary of Southern Authors, Vol. XV. He also assisted in the compilation of Memoirs of Georgia (1895), Modern Eloquence (1900), and other works.

Knight was the compiler of the official records of Georgia. delivered literary and historical addresses in various parts of the South. Knight served as second vice-president of the publishing firm of Martin & Hoyt, Atlanta, and vice-president of the John B. Daniel company. 

As a public speaker, Knight was constantly in demand. He was widely traveled, having several times crossed the ocean.

Personal life
In 1895, he married Edith Maria Nelson (b. 1875), of Atlanta. They had two children: Frances Walton and Mary Lamar.

His second wife was Rosa Talbot. She was a grand-niece of Georgia Governor Matthew Talbot, and a kinswoman of Gen. William H. T. Walker. 

In politics, he was a Democrat. In religion, he was Presbyterian.

Lucian Lamar Knight died November 19, 1933, in Clearwater, Florida.

Selected works
 Stone Mountain
 Reminiscences of Famous Georgians
 Georgia's Land-marks, Memorials and Legends
 Memorials of Dixieland
 A standard history of Georgia and Georgians, 1917

Editor
 Dictionary of Southern Authors (vols. XV and XVI Library of Southern Literature), 1909

Assistant editor
 Memoirs of Georgia, 1895
 Modern Eloquence, 1899

See also
 The Colonnades
 Druid Hills Presbyterian Church

References

1868 births
1933 deaths
Historians from Georgia (U.S. state)
American editors
20th-century American non-fiction writers
19th-century American journalists
20th-century American journalists
Royal Society of Arts
University of Georgia alumni
Princeton University alumni
American archivists